The 2017 First Data 500 was a Monster Energy NASCAR Cup Series race held on October 29, 2017, at Martinsville Speedway in Ridgeway, Virginia. Contested over 505 laps -- extended from 500 laps due to an overtime finish, on the .526 mile (.847 km) short track (extended from 500 laps), it was the 33rd race of the 2017 Monster Energy NASCAR Cup Series season, seventh race of the Playoffs, and first race of the Round of 8.

Report

Background

Martinsville Speedway is an International Speedway Corporation-owned NASCAR stock car racing track located in Henry County, in Ridgeway, Virginia, just to the south of Martinsville. At  in length, it is the shortest track in the NASCAR Monster Energy Cup Series. The track was also one of the first paved oval tracks in NASCAR, being built in 1947 by H. Clay Earles. It is also the only race track that has been on the NASCAR circuit from its beginning in 1948. Along with this, Martinsville is the only NASCAR oval track on the entire NASCAR track circuit to have asphalt surfaces on the straightaways, then concrete to cover the turns.

Entry list

Practice

First practice

Final practice

Qualifying

Qualifying results

Jimmie Johnson started from the rear after changing tires on the car following qualifying.

Race

Stage 1

Start 
Joey Logano led the field to the green flag at 3:16 p.m, Ty Dillon and Ricky Stenhouse Jr. wrecked in turn two on lap 37 to produce the first caution of the afternoon. NASCAR had planned to have a competition caution at lap 45 but chose to use the first true caution for the competition period.

The race restarted on lap 45 and it remained green for 18 laps, The second caution of the race flew on lap 63 when David Ragan spun out in turn 4, Ricky Stenhouse Jr. won the free pass under caution.

The race restarted on lap 69 and it remained green for 19 laps,  Contact between Danica Patrick and A. J. Allmendinger sent his car sliding on lap 87, bringing out the race’s third caution.

The race restarted on lap 94. 

Brad Keselowski, targeting Sunday’s race as a must-win, outran Kyle Busch by 1.1 seconds to win the race’s first stage on lap 130, Completing the top 10 were Joey Logano, Jimmie Johnson, Martin Truex Jr., Chase Elliott, Ryan Blaney, Kasey Kahne, Austin Dillon and Denny Hamlin. The fourth caution of the race flew on lap 132 to complete stage one.

Stage 2 
The race restarted on lap 140 and it remained green for 122 laps.

The race’s second stage ended with a tense battle for the lead between Brad Keselowski and arch-rival Kyle Busch. They bumped fenders with three laps remaining in the stage, Keselowski eventually winning the race to the finish line by 1.1 seconds. Following in the top 10 were Joey Logano, Martin Truex Jr., Chase Elliott, Ryan Blaney, Kevin Harvick, Matt Kenseth, Clint Bowyer and Jimmie Johnson, The fifth caution of the race flew to complete stage two.

Final stage 

The race restarted on lap 272 and it remained green for 32 laps, The sixth caution of the race flew on lap 304 when Kyle Larson, who fell out of the playoffs last week at Kansas Speedway, lost control of his car and crashed into the inside wall on the backstretch,  Larson finished 37th, his second consecutive finish of 35th or worse.

The race restarted on lap 314 and the seventh caution of the race flew three laps later when Erik Jones spun out in turn 4, Ryan Newman won the free pass under caution.

The race restarted on lap 322 and it remained green for 40 laps, The eighth caution of the race flew on lap 362 when Landon Cassill spun out in turn 4, There was no free pass under this caution.

The race restarted on lap 368 and it remained green for 91 laps, The ninth caution of the race flew on lap 459 for a single-car wreck in turn 2, A Carl Long crash brought the leaders to the pits for key stops. Chase Elliott’s crew returned his car to the track first. He was leading when Long’s wreck occurred. Elliott was followed out of the pits by Brad Keselowski, Joey Logano and Kyle Busch.

The race restarted on lap 465 and it remained green for 28 laps, The tenth caution of the race flew on lap 493 when Joey Logano spun out in turn 2, Chris Buescher won the free pass under caution.

The race restarted on lap 497 and the eleventh caution of the race flew on the final lap when race leader Brad Keselowski chose the outside line with Elliott running on the inside. Elliott ran Keselowski's car up the race track to take the lead until Hamlin raced to his back bumper, made contact and spun Elliott into the wall and crashed, sending the race into overtime.

Overtime 
The race restarted with two laps to go, Kyle Busch overtook Denny Hamlin to win the Round of 8 opener at the 70-year-old, half-mile track in southwest Virginia. 

Busch guaranteed himself a spot in the final four at Homestead-Miami Speedway with the victory and a chance to win his second championship. Busch won his first title in 2015.

Points leader Martin Truex Jr. finished second, followed by Clint Bowyer, Brad Keselowski and Kevin Harvick. The race ended under caution as a massive wreck broke out before Busch crossed the start-finish line that especially involving Harvick, Trevor Bayne, Hamlin, Blaney, Kenseth, Johnson,
Suarez, Kahne, Ty Dillon, Paul Menard, Buescher, Kurt Busch, Danica Patrick, Cassill, and Cole Whitt. Denny Hamlin finished seventh.

Race results

Stage results

Stage 1
Laps: 130

Stage 2
Laps: 130

Final stage results

Stage 3
Laps: 240

Race statistics
 Lead changes: 6 among different drivers
 Cautions/Laps: 11 for 74
 Red flags: 0
 Time of race: 3 hours, 32 minutes, 47 seconds
 Average speed:

Media

Television
NBC Sports covered the race on the television side. Rick Allen, Jeff Burton and Steve Letarte had the call in the booth for the race. Dave Burns, Marty Snider and Kelli Stavast reported from pit lane during the race.

Radio
MRN covered the radio call for the race, which was simulcast on Sirius XM NASCAR Radio.

Standings after the race

Drivers' Championship standings

Manufacturers' Championship standings

Note: Only the first 16 positions are included for the driver standings.

References

2017 in sports in Virginia
First Data 500
NASCAR races at Martinsville Speedway
First Data 500